This is a list of Shia mosques in the National Capital Region of India.

Delhi

Following is list of Shia mosques in the Delhi region of NCR of India:

Old Delhi/Central Delhi

Following is list of Shia mosques in the Old Delhi/Central Delhi District of Delhi region of NCR of India:

Following is list of Shia mosques in the New Delhi District of Delhi region of NCR of India:

Following is list of Shia mosques in the South Delhi District of Delhi region of NCE of India:

Following is list of Shia mosques in the East Delhi District of Delhi region of NCR of India:

Following is list of Shia mosques in the North East Delhi District of Delhi region of NCR of India:

Following is list of Shia mosques in the North Delhi District of Delhi region of NCR of India:

Following is list of Shia mosques in Noida region of NCR:

Following is list of Shia mosques in the North East Delhi District of Delhi region of NCR of India:

Following is list of Shia mosques in the North East Delhi District of Delhi region of NCR of India:

Following is list of Shia mosques in the North East Delhi District of Delhi region of NCR of India:

Following is list of Shia mosques in the North East Delhi District of Delhi region of NCR of India:

Following is list of Shia mosques in the North East Delhi District of Delhi region of NCR of India:

 
Mosques in Delhi
Shia mosques
Shia mosques in India